Maceday Lake  is an all-sports, 234-acre Oakland County, Michigan lake along the Clinton River.

Maceday Lake connects upstream with the 185-acre Lotus Lake downstream and with the  155-acre Williams Lake.

Blain Island lies between Maceday Lake and Lotus Lake.  It is accessible by car via a bridge. There are mostly high-end luxury homes on the island.

There is a public boat launch on Maceday Lake.

Maceday Lake is the second deepest lake in Oakland County behind Cass Lake. The ten deepest lakes in Oakland County are:

1.  Cass Lake (Waterford Twp. and West Bloomfield Twp.) 123 feet
2.  Maceday Lake (Waterford Twp.) 117 feet
3t.  Orchard Lake (West Bloomfield Twp.) 110 feet
3t.  Union Lake (Commerce Twp.) 110 feet
5.  Walnut Lake (West Bloomfield Twp.) 101 feet
6t.  Van Norman Lake (Independence Twp. and Waterford Twp.) 90 feet
6t.  Pine Lake (West Bloomfield Twp.) 90 feet
8.  Lake Angelus (Auburn Hills) 88 feet
9t. Loon Lake (Waterford Twp.) 73 feet
9t. Silver Lake (Waterford Twp.) 73 feet

Namesake

Maceday Lake was named for Mason "Mace" Day, who was seen fishing on the lake so often, the residents of the area began referring to the lake as Mace Day Lake.

Fish
Fish in Maceday Lake include pumpkinseed sunfish, largemouth bass, walleye, northern pike and crappie.

References

Lakes of Oakland County, Michigan
Lakes of Michigan
Lakes of Waterford Township, Michigan